Birwadi is a census town in Raigad district  in the state of Maharashtra, India.

Demographics
 India census, Birwadi had a population of 7271. Males constitute 54% of the population and females 46%. Birwadi has an average literacy rate of 75%, higher than the national average of 59.5%; with male literacy of 80% and female literacy of 68%. 16% of the population is under 6 years of age.

References

Cities and towns in Raigad district